Harald Slott-Møller (17 August 1864 – 20 October 1937) was a Danish painter and ceramist. Together with his wife, the painter Agnes Slott-Møller, he was a founding member of Den Frie Udstilling (The Free Exhibition).

Early life

Born in Copenhagen, Slott-Møller was the son of merchant Carl Emil Møller and Anna Maria née Møller. After completing the preparatory course at the Royal Danish Academy of Fine Arts (1883), he painted for three years under Peder Severin Krøyer.

Career
Slott-Møller first exhibited in 1886 at the Charlottenborg Spring Exhibition and attracted attention in 1888 with his large lively work Fattigfolk i Fattiglægens Venteværelse (Poor People in the Poor Doctor's Waiting Room). He exhibited at Kunsthal Charlottenborg and Den Frie Udstilling with individual portraits, such as that of Georg Brandes (Georg Brandes at the University in Copenhagen, 1889), and landscapes, which often featured a prominent spot. A change in style occurred in the early 1890s as can be seen in his portrait of the sculptor Anne Marie Brodersen, in which her fair hair is covered with gold, as are the cornfields in one of his landscapes. Then followed a series of painting which ensured him a place as one of the principal participants in 1890 painting: Tre kvinder (Three Women), Foraaret (Spring), and his strikingly symbolic work Primavera (1901). Slott-Møller is remembered for his portraits of well-known figures from Southern Jutland and South Schleswig, often characterized with customized backgrounds such as a landscape or appropriate buildings.

As a result, Slott-Møller gained wide recognition as one of the leading craftsmen of the turn of the century. Although he continued to paint, opinions about his work became ever less supportive, partly on artistic grounds but also as a result of his attitude towards the public.

In 1919, he became a Knight of the Dannebrog. He was a founding member of Den Frie Udstilling (The Free Exhibition). He is buried at Holmens Cemetery.

Slott-Møller is portrayed in a double portrait: Ude eller Kammerater (Out or Comrades, 1886) in which he and his wife have painted each other. Another self-portrait based on a study drawing was Trækfuglene (Migratory Birds, 1909). There is also a self-portrait in Florence's Uffizi Gallery (1924).

Selected paintings

References

External links

1864 births
1937 deaths
Artists from Copenhagen
20th-century Danish ceramists
Knights of the Order of the Dannebrog
19th-century Danish painters
Danish male painters
20th-century Danish painters
Burials at Holmen Cemetery
19th-century Danish male artists
20th-century Danish male artists